Perkins is an unincorporated community in Sioux County, Iowa, United States. At Perkins, U.S. Route 18 and U.S. Route 75 are concurrent roadways.

History
Perkins' population was 70 in 1925.

References

Unincorporated communities in Sioux County, Iowa
Unincorporated communities in Iowa